Stephan von Breuning (21 November 1894 – 11 March 1983) was an Austrian entomologist who specialised in the study of beetles (coleopterology), particularly within the longhorn family (Cerambycidae).

Career
An amateur working on the rich collections of the Muséum national d'Histoire naturelle, he described 7894 taxa of Cerambycidae.

Works

The complete list of his entomological works has been published in the Bulletin de la Société Sciences Nat, number 41.

One of his most famous works is Études sur les Lamiaires, published in Novitates Entomologicae, 1934–1946.

Personal life
He gave the photo shown together with a text to be published after his death. Von Breuning lived with his wife in a small studio at the top of an old building on rue Durantin, Paris 18ème.

Further reading

References

External links

Lamiaires du Monde Short Bio in English
DEI Zalf Collection and publication list.
Works by or about Stephan von Breuning from the Deutsche Nationalbibliothek

Austrian entomologists
20th-century Austrian zoologists
1894 births
1983 deaths
Coleopterists
Austrian taxonomists
Scientists from Vienna
University of Vienna alumni